Kuntur Sinqa (Quechua kuntur condor, sinqa nose, "condor nose", also spelled Condorsenga) is a mountain in the Cordillera Central in the Andes of Peru which reaches a height of approximately . It is located in the Junín Region, Jauja Province, Pomacancha District.

References 

Mountains of Peru
Mountains of Junín Region